is a fictional character in Bandai Namco's Tekken fighting game series, first featured as the protagonist in the original 1994 game and later became one of the major antagonists and antihero of the series. The son of worldwide conglomerate Mishima Zaibatsu CEO Heihachi Mishima, Kazuya seeks revenge against his father for throwing him down a cliff years earlier. Kazuya becomes corrupted in later games, seeking to obtain more power and later eventually comes into conflict with his son Jin Kazama. Devil Kazuya has often appeared as a separate character in previous installments (excluding Tekken (1994)) prior to becoming part of Kazuya's moveset in Tekken Tag Tournament 2 and later games. Kazuya Mishima is also present in related series media and other games.

The character was based on writer Yukio Mishima, with whom he shares a last name. A number of staff members have considered him one of the franchise's strongest characters, which has led to debates about reducing the damage of some of his moves or removing together. Kazuya Mishima's devil form was created to bring unrealistic fighters into the series, but the incarnation has made few appearances. Several voice actors have portrayed Kazuya Mishima in video games and films related to Tekken. In addition to appearances in spin-offs in the Tekken series, Kazuya also appears as a playable character in Namco × Capcom, Project X Zone 2, Street Fighter X Tekken, The King of Fighters All Star and Super Smash Bros. Ultimate.

Kazuya Mishima has been positively received by critics. A number of websites have listed him as one of the best Tekken characters and one of the best characters in fighting games. Journalists have praised Kazuya Mishima's moves and dark characterization, which rivals that of his father. In contrast, critical reception of Kazuya Mishima's portrayal in films has been mixed, with critics finding him generic.

Concept and creation 

Kazuya was created by Takuji Kawano. Tekken producer Katsuhiro Harada created Kazuya Mishima as a corrupted character with a "pure dark side" as opposed to his father Heihachi Mishima, who Harada identified as having a more "human dark side". The franchise's design team referred to Kazuya and Nina Williams as "the soul [or] the cool part" of the original 1994 game. Kazuya's design and characterization was influenced by a variety of sources. Kazuya's family name was taken from author Yukio Mishima, who was also used a model for the character's physical appearance. Harada compared Kazuya to a yakuza, while artist Takayuki Yamaguchi based the character's Tekken 6 costume on a robot. When describing Kazuya's personality, Harada cited him, along with Heihachi and Jin Kazama, as the violent characters of Tekken; he described the family as too quarrelsome. Denying claims that Tekken's plot is too convoluted, Harada said that its basic story is a "simple" struggle among members of the Mishima family with other characters dragged into the conflict.

Kazuya's characterization has been influenced by his tragic past. Despite his initial formulaic traits often seen in fighting games in the first Tekken game similar to Ryu from Street Fighter, Kazuya started showing signs of being a more of anti-stereotypical in the story; This was due to him becoming the villain from Tekken 2, clashing with his father multiple times who was the originally the boss of the first Tekken game.  Harada described Kazuya as focused on power; writing that the character addresses "different types of power", he explained: "that's kind of the story of Tekken and it's shown as the certain reality of people themselves rather than the idea law and order."

Namco created Tekken 7's storyline as a conclusion for Kazuya's struggle with Heihachi, though the company wanted the game's overall plot to be easily understood by newcomers. Harada also wanted the game to flesh out the characters' relationship and reveal why they are enemies. As part of the promotion for Tekken 7, he said that either Kazuya or Heihachi would die in their final fight. The game's story mode includes a young Kazuya during the time Heihachi threw his son through a cliff following a fight; Harada said that the version of the character may be playable depending on fan demand. Harada called Kazuya's final fight with Heihachi a "major milestone in the storyline". Surprised by the length of the rivalry between the characters and Tekken's popularity as a franchise, he felt it necessary to end in a fight to the death. Although Kazuya's rivalry with Heihachi ended in Tekken 7, his relationship with his son Jin was left unresolved. Harada said that Jin's mother Jun Kazama would be "an important and essential element in talking about the story of Kazuya and Jin". Kazuya's relationship with Jun has been described as a common love story in regards to the interactions between a corrupted man and a goodnaturedly woman, respectively. While Jun was originally meant to be Kazuya's enemy in Tekken 2, the two end up becoming lovers due to Jun finding the hidden caring side in Kazuya behind his devil persona.

Kazuya has appeared in games with Street Fighter characters. Kazuya fights Akuma during the end of Tekken 7's story mode; Harada explained that the outcome of the fight was intentionally ambiguous, saying: "It's still a work in progress." He joked that a scene with either character winning or being killed could negatively affect Namco's relationship with Capcom, particularly Capcom CEO Kenzo Tsujimoto. Kazuya teamed up with Nina for the crossover game Street Fighter X Tekken. When creating the illustrations for the characters, artist Kazuma Teshigawara said that he wanted them to complement one another. Nina was selected for the game instead of Anna Williams since her cold personality was similar to Kazuya's. The two characters were featured in the game's first trailer in a fight against Street Fighter characters Ryu and Ken Masters; the trailer was intended to attract the audience with the game's main feature. Completing the game with Kazuya and Nina unlocks an ending scene where Nina is revealed as an agent who escapes from Kazuya's forces. Artist Toshio Ohashi described the ending as the game's most cinematic due to similarities between the characters.

Devil persona and voice actors 

Kazuya's devil persona was created to meet Bandai Namco's request for more unrealistic characters in Tekken, such as Kuma, in contrast with the Virtua Fighter fighting series. Devil Kazuya is unlockable as an alternate skin for Kazuya in the first game, though he appears as a separate character for Tekken 2 and Tekken Tag Tournament, including for a turn-based RPG game Namco X Capcom with similar moves to Kazuya. Kazuya's devil form represents a common element in fantasy but it stands out due to its being related to his genes, most notably Jin's own devil. The parallelism between Kazuya and Jin's devils were compared with the protagonists from the Star Wars films, Darth Vader and Luke Skywalker, respectively.

The Devil fights with a laser,  (also known as ), through his staff and a pair of wings were added later in the game's production. He was made more powerful, with his ten-hit combo easily taking down enemies. Realizing how powerful the character had become, Namco decided to balance his moves before the game's release. The devil form is said to be based on Go Nagai's manga Devilman, where main character Akira Fudo develops a similar appearance. Although Kazuya's devil persona had first appeared as a single character, in Tekken 4 he was removed from the cast; according to Harada, Kazuya (unlike Jin) embraced the powers of the devil. In homage to Tekken: Blood Vengeance, Kazuya's devil form from the film was added as an alternate version of the character for Tag Tournament 2.

From the first Tekken to Tag Tournament, Kazuya has been voiced by Jōji Nakata. For the film Tekken: Blood Vengeance, writer Dai Satō added Jin and Kazuya as "visual eye-candy" similar to the Williams sisters (Nina and Anna). Satō wanted the pairs to be played together in the spin-off game Tekken Tag Tournament 2, which relies on two-person teams. The story about the cursed Shin Kamiya is meant to give the audience the negative side of the Devil Gene which kills people experimented on and only Kazuya and his son are able to control it. The fight between Kazuya, Jin and Heihachi proved to be the most difficult part to make since it is used three motion captures and the choreography was difficult to adapt. Japanese voice actor Masanori Shinohara enjoyed Kazuya's role in the Tekken CGI film, and hoped his fans would see him in action. Shinohara said that Kazuya is a character the fandom enjoys due to his cruel demeanor.

Gameplay
Motion actor Ryu Narushima performed many of Kazuya's moves while he was working on Jin. Kazuya's moves include techniques often used by his father and Jin, but some are unique. According to Harada, Kazuya is one of the most difficult characters for a player to control. He saw Kazuya as a fun character due to how powerful he is. As a result, Harada felt that gamers who lose while playing as him feel ashamed. While fans often questioned him, saying that Lars Alexandersson was the strongest character to use in tournaments, Harada denied such claims, believing the Mishimas were far more powerful. GameSpy said that while Kazuya retained his previous moves in Tekken 5, new additions over-powered the character to the point that players disliked using him. In the next game, GameSpy said that he was given launcher moves which (despite making the character stronger) could leave the player vulnerable.

Capcom recommended that players master Kazuya's  combo, suggesting that it might turn the character into one of the most powerful in Street Fighter X Tekken. Designing Kazuya's moves for this game, Capcom's Yoshinori Ono emailed Harada for ideas. Capcom soon received a Tekken guide and an email from Harada concerning Kazuya's moves. The character's combo had a glitch in this game, which Capcom patched. In the arcade game Tekken 7 Fated Retribution, three of Kazuya's moves were patched to increase the damage they inflict. In making Tekkens transition to the Unreal Engine, the staff was concerned about leaving Kazuya's Electric Wind Godfist because it was considered over-powered in previous games. Famitsu recommended the character to skilled players, saying that some of his techniques have good potential—most notably , which makes him Tekken 7 strongest character.

Appearances

Main Tekken games
Before the events of the original Tekken game, Kazuya enters the King of Iron Fist Tournament to seek vengeance against his father Heihachi, who had thrown him off a cliff for unknown reasons. After defeating Lee Chaolan in the later stages of the tournament, he narrowly defeats Paul Phoenix in a furious battle that lasted for hours in the semi-finals and reaches the finals, where he battles Heihachi. Kazuya defeats Heihachi and drops him from the same cliff he was thrown from as a child. In Tekken 2, Kazuya has taken over the Mishima Zaibatsu, which engages in illegal activities such as assassination, extortion, arms dealing, and the smuggling of protected species. Kazuya then announces a second King of Iron Fist Tournament. He is the game's final boss, and his alter-ego Devil is a hidden boss. Devil is said to appear as an overpowered version of Kazuya who became one with him before the events of the first Tekken game. Heihachi reclaims the Mishima Zaibatsu by defeating Kazuya and throws him into the mouth of an erupting volcano. Tekken 3 begins with Kazuya having impregnated Jun Kazama before his defeat by Heihachi.

Kazuya later returns as the main character in Tekken 4, set 21 years after Tekken 2. as Kazuya was revived by G Corporation (a genetics-company rival of the Mishima Zaibatsu), and allows the company to perform experiments on him to learn the nature of his Devil Gene. He vows revenge on Heihachi in the King of Iron Fist Tournament 4 and to extract the half of his Devil Gene in the body of his son, Jin Kazama. After defeating Violet in the later stages of the tournament, Kazuya advances to Stage 7 where he was scheduled to fight his son, Jin is ambushed and captured by the Tekken Force and taken to Hon-Maru, a Mishima Dojo in the woods. Declared the default winner of Stage 7, Kazuya meets Heihachi at the final stage and questions him of Jin's disappearance. They clash and Heihachi emerges victorious. After the fight, instead of killing Kazuya outright, Heihachi leads Kazuya to Hon-Maru, a Mishima compound where Jin is held captive. Kazuya, influenced by Devil, knocks Heihachi out of the room with his psychic power and taunts Jin to wake him up. Jin defeats Kazuya and Heihachi in battle, but spares their lives.

In Tekken 5, Kazuya and Heihachi are assaulted by a squadron of Jack-4s (machines sent to assassinate them by G Corporation for the Tekken Force raid on the corporation's laboratories) after Jin's departure from Hon-Maru. Kazuya jumps out of Hon-Maru, letting Heihachi die. Vowing revenge on the traitors, Kazuya enters the King of Iron Fist Tournament 5. During the tournament, Kazuya crosses paths with Raven, who recognizes him after seeing him flying away from the Hon-Maru. Kazuya defeats Raven and interrogates him. When he makes Raven talk, Kazuya discovers that he was betrayed by G Corporation, and that something was awakened from under Hon-Maru. Kazuya realizes what Heihachi has done, and speculates that, in fact, it is his grandfather Jinpachi Mishima, who is somehow controlling the Zaibatsu now. In Tekken 6, as the corporation's shadow head, he converts it into a military company which is the only opposition to the Mishima Zaibatsu (led by Jin), which has begun world conquest and declared war on several countries. The world sees G Corporation as its only savior, although Kazuya intends to kill Jin and dominate the world himself. He uses the company's influence to stop Jin from world domination. Kazuya meets his half-brother, Lars Alexandersson, before he can face Jin. They fight, and Kazuya is forced to leave.

In Tekken 7, Kazuya's mother is revealed as Kazumi Mishima, who died while trying to kill Heihachi. It is revealed that the young Kazuya sought revenge against his father but Heihachi knocked him out and threw him off the cliff as he noticed Kazuya inherited Kazumi's Devil Gene, which he finally confirmed it. In the story, Kazuya sends an army of Jack-6 robots to the Mishima dojo to eliminate Heihachi, who was confronted by the warrior Akuma moments before. Akuma says that he was sent by Kazumi to kill Kazuya and Heihachi, later confronting Kazuya at G Corporation's Millennium Tower and revealing his debt to Kazumi for saving his life from an unknown critical situation he was in. Surviving defeat by Akuma, Heihachi secretly captures images of the battle in which Kazuya transforms into his devil form. He broadcasts the images worldwide, exposing Kazuya's nature to undermine public trust in G Corporation as the Zaibatsu's opponents in the war. Heihachi blasts the Millennium Tower with a satellite in an attempt to destroy Kazuya and Akuma; Kazuya survives the attack, and destroys the satellite with a devil beam. Heihachi tells a reporter that Kazuya's devil gene came from his mother, Kazumi. In the final battle at the mouth of a volcano, Kazuya (the final boss of the story mode) transforms into his devil form, kills Heihachi, and throws him into a lava pit. Akuma resurfaces, having survived the previous blast. Kazuya transforms into his final devil form and they battle once more, with the outcome unknown. However, later after Heihachi's death, Jin, who recovers from coma thanks to Lars, Lee and Alisa, senses that Kazuya's devil  remains active, in addition to Lee and Alisa's confirmation of Kazuya's terror of the world instead of ending the ongoing world war, with Tekken 8 confirms his survival from his second encounter against Akuma.

Other games
Kazuya is the protagonist of the Tekken mobile game. He also appears in the non-canonical Tekken Tag Tournament, confronting his son's devil form at the end. Kazuya's devil persona is also playable; the game ends with his taking Jun after defeating her alter ego. In the sequel, Tekken Tag Tournament 2, Kazuya murders Jun to increase the power of his own devil form. As of this game onward, he can morph into Devil during gameplay with several new moves, instead of becoming a separate character, while Tekken 7 can only be accessed at low health at cost of his Rage Mode. Kazuya also appears in Tekken Revolution.

He appeared in devil form in the crossover strategy RPG Namco × Capcom, with several other Namco and Capcom characters. Kazuya made a playable debut in human form—also transforming into his devil form—in the sequel of Namco × Capcom successor, Project X Zone 2, teaming up with his son, Jin. Kazuya's image is downloadable content in Namco's Ace Combat: Assault Horizon, and it appears as in Taiko: Drum Master V Version. Although he does not appear, Kazuya is mentioned in the crossover fighting game PlayStation All-Stars Battle Royale.

He was one of the first characters featured in the Capcom's crossover fighting game, Street Fighter X Tekken. In the debut trailer, Kazuya defeats Dan Hibiki before confronting Street Fighter mascot Ryu. He wants to seize Pandora's Box to control the devil gene, and hires Nina Williams to assist him. Kazuya appeared in CyberConnect2's tactical role-playing game Full Bokko Heroes X in his Tekken 7 design, with a chibi look. He also appears in SNK's mobile phone game The King of Fighters All Star. Kazuya makes a cameo appearance with Heihachi in the PlayStation 5 game, Astro's Playroom. Kazuya appears as a DLC character along with Devil in Super Smash Bros. Ultimate, released on June 29, 2021. Later, an amiibo figure of Kazuya has been confirmed at Nintendo Direct in October 2021. Kazuya appears as a playable character in Fist of the North Star Legends ReVIVE.

Other media
Kazuya is the protagonist in the 1998 original video animation (OVA) Tekken: The Motion Picture. As in the Tekken game series, he is thrown off a cliff at a young age by Heihachi and saved by a deal with the devil. Kazuya becomes bent on revenge against Heihachi and enters the King of Iron Fist Tournament to confront him. Jun Kazama repeatedly implores him not to kill his father; after Kazuya defeats Heihachi, Jun destroys the devil's influence and restores his kind, compassionate self. He spares Heihachi's life and fathers Jin with Jun, but is not seen after the tournament's conclusion. Kazuya is voiced by Kazuhiro Yamaji in the original Japanese version and Adam Dudley in the English dub. He is also featured in the Tekken Forever and Tekken Saga comics. In the Titan comic, Kazuya briefly faces his son before assaulting the Mishima corporation.

Played by Ian Anthony Dale, he is the antagonist in the 2009 live-action film Tekken. Kazuya is Heihachi's right-hand man at Tekken Corporation, hoping to take over his father's company. Impatient with Heihachi's compassion for Jin, he overthrows him and orders his execution (although Heihachi persuades the soldier to spare him). After Jin wins the tournament, Kazuya challenges him to a one-on-one duel. Initially defeating Jin, Kazuya is critically wounded; however, Jin refuses to kill him because of their blood relation and lets him live in shame. Japanese-American martial artist-actor Kane Kosugi played Kazuya in the 2014 prequel, Tekken 2: Kazuya's Revenge. An amnesiac after experiments by his father, Kazuya spends the movie fighting until he regains his memory.

He is present in the CGI-animated film Tekken: Blood Vengeance, an alternate version of the events between Tekken 5 and Tekken 6; Kazuya, an antagonist, faces his father and son and is defeated by the latter. Played by Kefi Abrikh, he appears in the live-action short film Tekken Tag Tournament 2. His role in the franchise is also told in the novel, Tekken: The Dark History of Mishima.

Reception

Critical reception of the character has been largely positive, and he has often been listed as one of the best Tekken characters due to his appeal to gamers. Complex writers praised his dark backstory, saying that Kazuya became increasingly attractive over time, calling him the greatest character of the franchise. According to the magazine's website, Kazuya was one of the characters they wanted to see in Super Smash Bros. for Nintendo 3DS and Wii U. FHM compared him to Street Fighter Ryu, based on their popularity and representation of their respective series. Kazuya was also compared to his father, Heihachi, due to their similar natures and rivalry. Bandai Namco opened the Tekken Museum in Osaka in May 2012, where a statue of Kazuya and Jin performing a cross-counter was exhibited.

A number of websites have noted on Kazuya's dark characterization in the games. Den of Geek enjoyed Kazuya's strong violence, such as his murder of his grandfather Jinpachi Mishima at the end of Tekken 5. By Tekken 4, IGN had praised his evil traits and intention to participate in the series' tournaments. Although GamesRadar noted that Kazuya had been disliked, they and other websites praised his transformation into a devil (enhancing his evil characteristics). Kotaku  compared him with Heihachi and called him one of gaming's worst parents due to his antagonism to his son, Jin. PlayStation Universe ranked Kazuya and Heihachi among the top five rival pairs in Tekken Tag Tournament 2 due to their relationship and power, describing them as one of the game's best tags. While enjoying his appearances in the series, Den of Geek felt Kazuya tends to lose most of his fights in the franchise.

Kazuya's alter ego, Devil Kazuya, was also praised. The difficulty in unlocking him in the series' first game did not prevent him from being listed as one of the best characters, similar to Kazuya. According to GamesRadar, players wanted to see a fight between Devil Kazuya and Akuma in Street Fighter X Tekken due to the similarities in their design. In a Namco poll, Kazuya was the 18th-most-requested Tekken character to be playable in Tekken X Street Fighter (with 6.51 percent of the vote); 5.05 percent of the votes were cast for Devil, a separate voting option. In Tekken 7, a bonus fight between Devil Kazuya and Akuma could be unlocked. Calling Devil Kazuya a difficult opponent, Shacknews and Hobby Consolas said that Akuma offered players a challenge; gamers needed to learn Devil Kazuya's moves to defeat him, resulting in the game's most difficult fight.

Websites have also noted Kazuya's moves, and his Lightning Screw Uppercut was listed by GamesRadar as one of the most satisfying uppercuts in gaming history. Prima Games praised Kazuya's Electric Wind God Fist for its impact on the enemy and possible player combos, and ArcadeSushi recommended it to players wanting to use the Mishima characters. Kazuya's Spinning Demon was performed by Eric Jacobus, attracting Harada's attention.

Kazuya's appearances outside the Tekken games have also been noted. Alex Henning of The Fandom Post stated that John Kim's Western comics adapted well Kazuya's personality in the series, finding it similar to his game incarnation. For the anime film Tekken: The Motion Picture, Eric Sandroni of Games Retrospect called Kazuya one of the film's characters who seemed realistic. However, Adam Dudley's performance as Kazuya in the anime's English dub was not well-received. In a review of the first Tekken live-action film, DVD Talk had negative opinions on Kazuya and Heihachi's subplot regarding their rivalry. In Kazuya's Revenge, Manlu Movie panned the actor's performance. GameCrate disliked his moves (calling them "noticeably generic") and his romantic relationship with Laura. Phil Wheat had mixed feelings about Kazuya's role, saying he was still appealing though longtime fans may dislike the changes to his character; Wheat described the teaser for a new film as engaging, and said that he enjoyed seeing Kazuya fight his son, Jin. Games Retrospect was harsher, calling Kazuya a "flat" character due to his generic traits. With an art piece, Tekken commemorated Kazuya's inclusion as a DLC character in Super Smash Bros. Ultimate. Screen Rants Scott Baird expressed disappointment at seeing yet another fighting game character. He went on to say that Tekken has a lot of fascinating characters, and claimed that Kazuya is one of the most uninteresting characters in Super Smash Bros. Ultimate.

See also
List of Tekken characters

References

Action film characters
Demon characters in video games
Fictional business executives
Fictional businesspeople in video games
Fictional characters who have made pacts with devils
Fictional Japanese people in video games
Fictional karateka
Fictional martial artists in video games
Fictional mass murderers
Fictional patricides
Fictional shotokan practitioners
Fictional victims of domestic abuse
Male characters in video games
Male film villains
Male video game villains
Namco antagonists
Namco protagonists
Super Smash Bros. fighters
Tekken characters
Undead characters in video games
Video game bosses
Video game characters introduced in 1994
Video game characters who can move at superhuman speeds
Video game characters with electric or magnetic abilities
Video game characters with slowed ageing
Video game characters with superhuman strength
Video game mascots